Tokomaru may refer to:

Tokomaru Bay, the name of a bay and town in the East Cape of New Zealand
Tokomaru, New Zealand, a town in the Horowhenua district of New Zealand
 The Tokomaru Steam Engine Museum in Tokomaru 
 The Tokomaru railway station in Tokomaru
Tokomaru (canoe), a Māori migration canoe
, a British cargo ship, built in 1893, that was torpedoed in the English Channel in 1915